John Bampton (fl. 1340) was an English Carmelite theologian of the fourteenth century.

Life
Bampton was born at Bampton, Devon. Bale, quoting Leland, states that he paid special attention to the works of Aristotle, and was admitted to his doctor's degree in divinity.

Works
The titles of two treatises by this author have been preserved, respectively entitled Octo quæstiones de veritate propositionum and Lecturæ scholasticæ in Theologiâ.

References

Attribution

Year of birth missing
Year of death missing
14th-century English Roman Catholic theologians
Clergy from Devon
Carmelites